John "Johnny" Freeman (second ¼ 1934 – 22 June 2017) was a Welsh rugby union, and professional rugby league footballer who played in the 1950s and 1960s.

Background
Johnny Freeman was born in Cardiff, Wales, and he died aged 83.

Playing career

International honours
Johnny Freeman represented Wales (RL) while at Halifax in 1963 against France at Stade des Minimes, Toulouse on Sunday 17 February 1963.

After scoring 38 tries in the first 20 games of the 1957–58 Northern Rugby Football League season Johnny Freeman also looked set to take a place on the 1958 British Lions tour to Australasia. However, a knee injury in December 1957 cut short his international ambitions, and put him out of the game for a year.

Championship final appearances
Johnny Freeman played , and scored a try in Halifax's 9-10 defeat by Hull F.C. in the Championship Final during the 1955–56 season at Maine Road, Manchester on Saturday 12 May 1956, and played  in the 15-7 victory over St. Helens in the Championship Final during the 1964–65 season at Station Road, Swinton on Saturday 22 May 1965.

Challenge Cup Final appearances
Johnny Freeman played  in Halifax's 2-13 defeat by St.Helens in the 1955–56 Challenge Cup Final during the 1955–56 season at Wembley Stadium, London on Saturday 28 April 1956.

County Cup Final appearances
Johnny Freeman played , i.e. number 5, in Halifax's 10-0 victory over Featherstone Rovers in the 1963–64 Yorkshire County Cup Final during the 1963–64 season at Belle Vue, Wakefield on Saturday 2 November 1963.

Club career
Johnny Freeman was paid a joining fee of £1,050 by Halifax in 1954 (based on increases in average earnings, this would be approximately £62,730 in 2013).

Club records
Johnny Freeman holds Halifax's tries in a season record with 48 scored in the 1956–57 season, and the tries in a career record with 290 scored between 1954 and 1967.

Testimonial match
Johnny Freeman's Testimonial match at Halifax took place in 1967 against Keighley at Thrum Hall, Halifax.

Career appraisal
In the book "The Glory of Their Times: Crossing the Colour Line in Rugby League", Robert Gate's description of Johnny Freeman was… "It appeared that every time Freeman got the ball he scored or at least threatened to score. Certainly the crowds began to expect miracles when he was in possession. Here was a man who could go the length of the field, who could break tackles when apparently held, who could find that extra gear, when already seemingly flat out, who could go past defenders on the inside or the outside, who would be first to any kick forward and who could pluck interception tries out of nothing. He had star quality, good looks and an effortless movement which was captivating."

Honoured at Halifax
Johnny Freeman is a Halifax Hall of Fame Inductee.

Genealogical information
Johnny Freeman's daughter, Karen, was a professional dancer. Starred in Bubbling Brown Sugar 1978 Royalty Theatre also was a member of David Merrick original tap dancing extravaganza  42nd Street at Theatre Royal Drury Lane, professional choreographer for many artists on Top of the pops, including Living in a box Sheakespear sister, Bill Withers, D-ream a talented backing vocalist and also had a number 12 in the charts with the pop group Mirrorball who released the song Given Up, it reached number 12 in the UK Singles Chart in 2001, and she performed the song on Top of the Pops, and in 2008 she appeared in the Channel 4 Reality television series When Women Rule the World.

Johnny Freeman is the cousin of the British and British Empire heavyweight boxing champion, Joe Erskine.

References

External links
At last: Rugby League tells its story
Halifax RL legend Johnny Freeman's daughter set to be the next reality TV star
(archived by web.archive.org) Black History
Early memories and Johnny Freeman

1934 births
2017 deaths
Black British sportspeople
Footballers who switched code
Halifax R.L.F.C. players
Rugby league centres
Rugby league players from Cardiff
Rugby league wingers
Rugby union centres
Rugby union players from Cardiff
Wales national rugby league team players
Welsh rugby league players
Welsh rugby union players